Mokéko is a district in the Sangha Department of Republic of the Congo.

References 

Sangha Department (Republic of the Congo)
Districts of the Republic of the Congo